Medieval Exegesis: The Four Senses of Scripture, is a three-volume study by Henri de Lubac, first published in French between 1959 and 1964. It is considered to be one of the most important and thorough studies of the history of medieval exegesis. Its subject matter ranges from the early Christian patristics to the later Middle Ages and its primary subject matter, as its subtitle suggests, is the development of the four-fold method of scriptural interpretation, i.e., allegory, typology, tropology, and anagogy.

The full set in English is published by Eerdmans:
Vol. 1, 489 pgs. (1998) Translated by Mark Sebanc 
Vol. 2, 453 pgs. (2000) Translated by E. M. Macierowski  
Vol. 3, 800 pgs. (2009) Translated by E. M. Macierowski  

1959 non-fiction books
Christian theology books